Boy Golden: Shoot to Kill is a 2013 Philippine action biopic loosely based on the life of Arturo Porcuna who rises through the Manila underworld in the 1960s until his murder. It was  an official entry to the 39th Metro Manila Film Festival.

Cast

Main cast 
Jeorge Estregan as Arturo "Boy Golden" Porcuna
KC Concepcion as Marla "Marla Dy" De Guzman

Supporting cast 
Joem Bascon as a gangster in the film's opening
John Estrada as Tony Razon
Tonton Gutierrez as Col. Maristela
Leo Martinez as Mr. Ho
Gloria Sevilla as Aling Puring
Eddie Garcia as Atty. Dante Sagalongos
Jhong Hilario as Guido
Baron Geisler as Datu Putla
Roi Vinzon as Alias Tekla
John Lapus as Cabaret Manager
Mon Confiado as Rachel Viego
Dindo Arroyo as Maning Pusa
Derrick Monasterio as Anton 
Dick Israel as Boy Bungal
Deborah Sun
Simon Ibarra
Gerald Ejercito
Dexter Doria
Buboy Villar
DJ Durano as Entong Intsik
Marc Abaya  
Roldan Aquino as Don Ricardo de Montiel
Mathew Barrios as Atty. Andrade
Paolo Serrano as Totoy Balantik
Bembol Roco as Frederico delos Reyes
Lloyd Samartino
Brandon Gepfer as Randy
Prapimporn Karnchanda as Nanette
Gerhard Acao

Awards

References

External links
 
 

2013 films
Philippine action films
Films directed by Chito S. Roño
Philippine biographical films
Viva Films films
Biographical action films
Philippine gangster films